Cathy Apourceau-Poly (born 18 April 1965) is a French Communist Party politician and a member of the Senate of France since July 2018.

Biography
Apourceau-Poly was elected to the Regional Council of Nord-Pas-de-Calais in 2004 and re-elected in 2010.

She was a member of the municipal council of Avion, Pas-de-Calais, where she administered the Communal Center for Social Action.

She became a senator on 1 July 2018, after 's resignation. She enlisted in the Communist, Republican, Citizen and Ecologist group and was a member of the Commission for Social Affairs.

She stood as the 54th candidate on Ian Brossat's list in the 2019 European Parliament election.

References

External links
Cathy Apourceau-Poly, French Senate official website
Cathy Apourceau-Poly, NosSénateurs.fr 

21st-century French women politicians
Regional councillors of France
French Senators of the Fifth Republic
Senators of Pas-de-Calais
Politicians from Hauts-de-France
French Communist Party politicians
1965 births
Living people
Women members of the Senate (France)